Frank Keetley (23 March 1901 – 13 January 1968) was an English footballer who played inside forward. One of eleven brothers and one sister, he was born in Derby and came from a footballing family with several other brothers who played professionally including Arthur, Harry, Tom, Joe and Charlie.

Playing career
In February 1921, Frank moved from Victoria Ironworks to Derby County, making his debut on 1 October 1921 in a 3–0 defeat away at Nottingham Forest. In total he turned out 82 times for Derby, scoring 8 goals.

Keetley played professionally for Derby County, Doncaster Rovers, Bradford City, Lincoln City and Hull City between 1921 and 1933, making a total of 256 Football League appearances.

Three of his brothers, Harry, Tom and Joe, also played for Doncaster during their careers.

On 16 January 1932, he scored 6 goals for Lincoln in 21 minutes of the second half in a 9–1 victory against Halifax at Sincil Bank, an all-time record for The Imps.

He later played a season for Margate scoring 30 goals, before going on to be player manager of Worcester City.

References

1901 births
1968 deaths
Footballers from Derby
English footballers
Association football inside forwards
Derby County F.C. players
Doncaster Rovers F.C. players
Bradford City A.F.C. players
Lincoln City F.C. players
Hull City A.F.C. players
Margate F.C. players
Worcester City F.C. players
English Football League players
English football managers
Worcester City F.C. managers